Macrocossus grebennikovi is a moth in the family Cossidae. It is found in Malawi.

References

Natural History Museum Lepidoptera generic names catalog

Endemic fauna of Malawi
Cossinae